The 2020 PETRONAS Tour de Langkawi was a professional road bicycle racing stage race held in Malaysia from 6 to 14 February 2020. It was the 25th edition of the Tour de Langkawi. The race was rated by the Union Cycliste Internationale (UCI) as a 2.Pro race as part of the 2020 UCI Asia Tour and the 2020 UCI ProSeries.

Teams
Twenty-one teams, which consisted of one UCI WorldTeam, five UCI Professional Continental teams, fourteen UCI Continental teams, and one national team, were invited to the race. Of the 123 riders who started the race, 107 finished.

UCI WorldTeams

 

UCI Professional Continental Teams

 
 
 
 
 

UCI Continental Teams

 
 
 
 
 
 
 
 
 
 
 
 
 
 

National Teams

 Malaysia

Route
East Malaysian states Sabah and Sarawak returned as stage hosts for this edition, 23 years after the 1997 edition. A criterium international race was held in Kota Kinabalu a day before the first stage that targeted Under–23 (U23) professional/independent elite riders, while a Malaysian classic race dubbed the "Race of Champions" was held in Langkawi the day after the final stage.

Stages

Pre-Race Criterium
6 February 2020 — Kota Kinabalu, Sabah,

Stage 1
7 February 2020 — Kuching, Sarawak,

Stage 2
8 February 2020 — Kuala Terengganu to Kerteh,

Stage 3
9 February 2020 — Temerloh, Pahang to KLCC, Kuala Lumpur,

Stage 4
10 February 2020 — Putrajaya to Genting Highlands, Pahang,

Stage 5
11 February 2020 — Kuala Kubu Bharu, Selangor to Ipoh, Perak,

Stage 6
12 February 2020 — Taiping, Perak, Perak to Penang Island,

Stage 7
13 February 2020 — Bagan, Penang to Alor Setar, Kedah,

Stage 8
14 February 2020 — Langkawi, Kedah (Dataran Lang – Kuah),

Post-Race Classic
15 February 2020 — Langkawi, Kedah,

Classification leadership table

Final standings

General classification

Points classification

Mountains classification

Asian rider classification

Teams classification

References

External links
Official Website 
Pro Cycling Stats

2020
2020 UCI ProSeries
2020 UCI Asia Tour
2020 in Malaysian sport
February 2020 sports events in Asia